The Mosier Mounds Complex (Smithsonian trinomial: 35WS274), also known locally as the Mosier Battlements, is an archaeological site near Mosier, Oregon, United States. This collection of stone walls, pits, and mounds amid a basalt talus slope is the largest and most complex of a number of similar Native American sites in the southern Columbia Plateau. The site predates the arrival of Europeans and probably the local ascendance of Chinookan peoples, but has resisted more precise dating or cultural affiliation.

The site was added to the National Register of Historic Places in 2003.

See also
National Register of Historic Places listings in Wasco County, Oregon

References

Archaeological sites on the National Register of Historic Places in Oregon
National Register of Historic Places in Wasco County, Oregon